Philippe Sauvé (born February 27, 1980) is an American former professional ice hockey goaltender who last played with the Hamburg Freezers of the Deutsche Eishockey Liga. Sauvé played in the National Hockey League for the Colorado Avalanche, Calgary Flames, Phoenix Coyotes and the Boston Bruins.

Playing career
As a youth, Sauvé played in the 1993 and 1994 Quebec International Pee-Wee Hockey Tournaments with a minor ice hockey team from the Mille-Îles neighbourhood of Laval, Quebec.

Sauvé was drafted in round 2, 38th overall, by the Colorado Avalanche in the 1998 NHL Entry Draft, where he would serve as the backup goaltender and play in 17 games for the Avalanche before being traded on August 8, 2005, to the Calgary Flames for a conditional 7th-round draft pick.
In the 2005–06 season, after a 7–4 defeat to the Colorado Avalanche, he had a fight with former teammate David Aebischer on January 24, 2006.

On February 1, 2006, he was traded to the Phoenix Coyotes with Steven Reinprecht for Brian Boucher and Mike Leclerc. After playing only 5 games with the Coyotes, Sauvé was then traded to the Boston Bruins for Tyler Redenbach on November 14, 2006.

Sauvé played just 2 games with the Boston Bruins before being demoted to the American Hockey League (AHL). The following year for the 2007–08 season, he signed a contract with the Iowa Stars of the AHL before leaving for the DEL's Hamburg Freezers on January 21, 2008.

He portrayed Boston Bruins goaltender Sugar Jim Henry in the 2005 Quebec film The Rocket (Maurice Richard) based on the life on Maurice Richard. The famous handshake photo of Richard and Henry was recreated in the film with Sauvé as Henry and Roy Dupuis as Richard.

Family 
He is the son of former NHL goaltender Bob Sauvé. He is also the nephew of Jean-François Sauvé and the cousin of Jean-Francois' son, Maxime Sauvé.

Regular season and playoffs

International

Awards and honours

See also
 Notable families in the NHL

References

External links

1980 births
American men's ice hockey goaltenders
American people of Québécois descent
Canadian ice hockey goaltenders
Boston Bruins players
Calgary Flames players
Colorado Avalanche draft picks
Colorado Avalanche players
Drummondville Voltigeurs players
Hamburg Freezers players
Hamilton Bulldogs (AHL) players
Hershey Bears players
Hull Olympiques players
Ice hockey people from Buffalo, New York
Ice hockey people from Quebec
Iowa Stars players
Living people
Mississippi Sea Wolves players
People from Joliette
Phoenix Coyotes players
Providence Bruins players
Rimouski Océanic players
San Antonio Rampage players
Canadian expatriate ice hockey players in Germany